Hezekiél Sello Sepeng (born 30 June 1974), is a South African middle distance runner who won silver in the Olympic 800 metres final in Atlanta 1996 (behind Vebjørn Rodal), the 1998 Commonwealth Games (behind Japheth Kimutai) and the World Championships' final in Seville 1999 (behind Wilson Kipketer). He was banned from competition from May 2005 to May 2007 after a positive doping test for nandrolone.

He was born in Potchefstroom and educated at Potchefstroom Boys High, where he was in the same class as South African commonwealth boxer Sean Santana.

See also
List of sportspeople sanctioned for doping offences

References

External links

1974 births
People from Potchefstroom
Doping cases in athletics
South African male middle-distance runners
South African sportspeople in doping cases
Athletes (track and field) at the 1996 Summer Olympics
Athletes (track and field) at the 2000 Summer Olympics
Athletes (track and field) at the 2004 Summer Olympics
Athletes (track and field) at the 1994 Commonwealth Games
Athletes (track and field) at the 1998 Commonwealth Games
Living people
Olympic athletes of South Africa
Olympic silver medalists for South Africa
Commonwealth Games medallists in athletics
World Athletics Championships medalists
World Athletics Championships athletes for South Africa
Commonwealth Games silver medallists for South Africa
Medalists at the 1996 Summer Olympics
Olympic silver medalists in athletics (track and field)
African Games bronze medalists for South Africa
African Games medalists in athletics (track and field)
Universiade medalists in athletics (track and field)
Athletes (track and field) at the 1999 All-Africa Games
Universiade gold medalists for South Africa
Medalists at the 1995 Summer Universiade
Medalists at the 1997 Summer Universiade
Medallists at the 1994 Commonwealth Games
Medallists at the 1998 Commonwealth Games